Firebrand is a 2019 Indian Marathi-language drama film written and directed by Aruna Raje. The film features Usha Jadhav, Sachin Khedekar and Girish Kulkarni in the lead roles.

The film was released on 22 February 2019 on Netflix. Firebrand is a contemporary story of self-discovery and catharsis. This was Aruna Raje's comeback movie after a 15-year absence.

Plot
Sunanda Raut (Usha Jadhav) is a feminist divorce lawyer, fending off injustice in Indian courtrooms for women such as rape, domestic abuse, mental illness, the complexities of marriage, sex and love. On top of this, she has to deal with her own real-life trauma.

Cast 
 Usha Jadhav as Sunanda Raut
 Girish Kulkarni as Madhav Patkar
 Sachin Khedekar as Anand Pradhan
 Rajeshwari Sachdev as Divya Patel Pradhan
 Puja Agarwal as Natasha
 Amol Deshmukh as Dr. Nadkarni
 Sanjeev Dhuri as Judge Pandurang Thipse
 Ganesh Jamble as Ramesh Bodke
 Mrunal Oak as Anuya Pradhan
 Vaibhavi Pardeshi as Renukabai (maid)
 Pooja Raibagi as Smita Waghmare
 Laxman Singh Rajput as Dileep
 Rushad Rana as Advocate - Freddie Mehta
 Ranjeet Randive as Shankar Bhau
 Ankita Raval as Radhika

Release
It was released on 22 February 2019 on Netflix.

References

External links 

 
 

2010s Marathi-language films
Indian drama films
Indian direct-to-video films
2019 direct-to-video films
Films directed by Aruna Raje
2019 films
2019 drama films
Marathi-language Netflix original films